Nickel(II) acetate is the name for the coordination compounds with the formula Ni(CH3CO2)2·x H2O where x can be 0, 2, and 4.  The green tetrahydrate Ni(CH3CO2)2·4 H2O is most common. It is used for electroplating.

Synthesis and structure
The compound can be prepared by treating nickel or nickel(II) carbonate with acetic acid:

NiCO3 +  2 CH3CO2H   + 3 H2O →   Ni(CH3CO2)2·4 H2O  +  CO2

The green tetrahydrate has been shown by X-ray crystallography to adopt an octahedral structure, the central nickel centre being coordinated by four water molecules and two acetate ligands. It may be dehydrated in vacuo,  by reaction with acetic anhydride or by heat.

Safety
Nickel salts are carcinogenic and irritate the skin.

References

Nickel compounds
Acetates